Glenn Lee Van Wieren (born August 17, 1942) is an American former college basketball coach who served as the head coach of the Hope Flying Dutchmen men's basketball team for 33 seasons spanning from 1977 to 2010.

Head coaching record

See also
List of college men's basketball coaches with 600 wins

References

External links
 Coach Van Wieren Leaves Rich Legacy

1942 births
Living people
American basketball coaches
College men's basketball head coaches in the United States
Hope Flying Dutchmen men's basketball coaches
Hope College alumni
Hope Flying Dutchmen men's basketball players